Cup-a-Soup is an instant soup product sold under various brands worldwide. The soup is sold in sachets of powder which can be poured into a mug or cup, which is then filled with near-boiling water and stirred.

In the United States and Canada the product is manufactured and marketed by Unilever's Lipton brand, and in Australia under the Continental brand. In the United Kingdom the product is sold as Batchelors Cup-a-Soup, a brand which is now owned by Premier Foods. In the Netherlands it is sold under the Unox brand.  In South Africa, Sweden, Belgium, Denmark, Germany, Argentina, Poland and India it is sold under the Knorr brand, although it is distributed by Ajinomoto in Japan, which shares the same brand.

Flavours include minestrone, chicken noodle, tomato soup and chicken and vegetable. Low-calorie versions also exist in the UK, under the name "Slim-a-Soup", and include slightly different flavors, such as Mediterranean tomato. 2007 saw the introduction of "Cup-a-Soup Extra", individual sachets of soup and pasta sold in a variety of flavors, including cheese and broccoli (with tagliatelle), chicken and mushroom (with pasta), minestrone, and Tangy Salsa Tomato.

List by brands
 Batchelors
 Continental (brand)
 McCormick & Company

See also
 List of instant foods

References

External links
US Cup-a-Soup website
Indian Cup-a-Soup website

Brand name soups
Unilever brands
Instant foods and drinks